The Province of Magdeburg was a province of the Free State of Prussia within Nazi Germany from 1944 to 1945. The provincial capital was Magdeburg.

The province was created on 1 July 1944 out of Regierungsbezirk Magdeburg, a government region from the former Province of Saxony.

The province was occupied by American troops after the conquest of Magdeburg in April 1945 during World War II. After the territory was transferred from American to Soviet control, it was merged with Halle-Merseburg and Anhalt to recreate the Province of Saxony, later renamed the Province of Saxony-Anhalt and ultimately the Federal State of Saxony-Anhalt.

Districts in 1945

Regierungsbezirk Magdeburg

Urban districts
 Aschersleben
 Burg bei Magdeburg
 Halberstadt
 Magdeburg
 Quedlinburg
 Salzwedel
 Stendal

Rural districts
Calbe a./S.
Gardelegen
Haldensleben
Jerichow I (seat: Burg bei Magdeburg)
Jerichow II (seat: Genthin)
Oschersleben (Bode)
Osterburg
Quedlinburg
Salzwedel
Stendal
Wanzleben
Wernigerode
Wolmirstedt

Notes

1944 establishments in Germany
States and territories established in 1944
1945 disestablishments in Germany
States and territories disestablished in 1945
Province of Magdeburg
Provinces of Prussia
Former states and territories of Saxony-Anhalt